The Municipality of the District of Lunenburg, is a district municipality in Lunenburg County, Nova Scotia, Canada. Statistics Canada classifies the district municipality as a municipal district.

Lunenburg surrounds the towns of Bridgewater, Lunenburg, and Mahone Bay, which are incorporated separately and not part of the district municipality.

Demographics 

See also
 List of municipalities in Nova Scotia

References

External links

Communities in Lunenburg County, Nova Scotia
District municipalities in Nova Scotia